Paleotempestology is the study of past tropical cyclone activity by means of geological proxies as well as historical documentary records. The term was coined by American meteorologist Kerry Emanuel.

Examples

Non-tropical examples

See also
Tropical cyclone
Tropical cyclone observation
Tropical cyclones and climate change

Notes

References

Citations

General sources

Further reading

External links 
Western North Atlantic Basin 8,000 Year palaeotempestology Database 2018
palaeotempestology Resource Center
Shipwrecks, tree rings and hurricanes

Tempestology
Tropical cyclone meteorology
Paleoclimatology